Mehinj or Mehanj or Mehnaj or Mehnej or Mihinj or Mehenj may refer to:
 Mehinj, Khusf
 Mehenj, Qaen